Cristian Adolfo Nuñez López (born 7 July 1988) is a Canadian former professional soccer player.

Career
Nuñez played AAA minor soccer with Montreal-Concordia from U13 to U18 where he received the Ballon d'Or Trophy from the Quebec Elite Soccer League. While playing for NTC Ontario Nuñez won the silver medal at the Canadian U15 selection championships in 2003. In the following season he won the gold medal.

Nuñez signed his first professional contract with FC Lyn Oslo in July 2006. He did not feature in a single match due to visa issues. Which resulted in him remaining four months with the club. In 2007 Nuñez signed with newly expansion Toronto FC where he didn't play a single match in the regular season. He played 13 games for the Toronto FC reserve team, where he tallied one assist against the New England Revolution reserve squad.

The following season Nuñez was released from Toronto FC and signed with the Montreal Impact of the USL First Division. Soon after he was loaned to Montreal's farm team Trois-Rivières Attak in the Canadian Soccer League. He made his debut on May 31, 2008 against St. Catharines Wolves. Nuñez helped the Attak claim the club's first National Division title, and reached the final of the CSL Cup, where they were defeated by Serbian White Eagles by a score of 2-1 in a penalty shootout.

During February 2009, Nuñez had a trial with Bohemian F.C. of Dublin. In 2009, he played with Montreal Carabins. In 2012, he signed with AS Blainville in the newly formed Première Ligue de soccer du Québec.

International career
Nuñez was part of the Canada U-20 men's national soccer team, which took part in the 2007 FIFA World Youth Championship. Played the first two games against Chile and Austria. He played futsal by the QCSL World Cup 2010.

Personal life
Nuñez was born to an Argentine father and a Nicaraguan mother and studied Arts and Sciences at the Université de Montréal.

References

1988 births
Living people
Canadian expatriate soccer players
Canadian expatriate sportspeople in Norway
Canadian Soccer League (1998–present) players
Canadian soccer players
Expatriate footballers in Norway
Association football midfielders
Montreal Impact (1992–2011) players
Soccer players from Montreal
Toronto FC players
Trois-Rivières Attak players
USL First Division players
Canadian men's futsal players
Lyn Fotball players
Canada men's youth international soccer players
Canadian people of Argentine descent
Canadian people of Nicaraguan descent
FC L'Assomption players